The men's 3000 metres steeplechase event at the 2007 Asian Athletics Championships was held in Amman, Jordan on July 27.

Results

References
Final results

3000
Steeplechase at the Asian Athletics Championships